Kushnarenkovo is a rural locality (a selo) and the administrative center of Kushnarenkovsky District of the Republic of Bashkortostan, Russia, located on the Belaya River. Population:  Since 1941 the International Lenin School worked here under a code name of an agricultural college.

References

Notes

Sources

Rural localities in Kushnarenkovsky District